Chuhsiungichthys is an extinct genus of ichthyodectiform ray-finned fish that lived in freshwater environments in what is now Yunnan, China,  and Kyushu, Japan, during the Cretaceous.  It differs from its sister genus, Mesoclupea, primarily by having a comparatively more anteriorly-placed dorsal fin.

The type species, C. tsanglingensis, is found in Upper Cretaceous-aged strata of Chuhsiung, Yunnan Province.  C. yanagidai is found in the first formation of the Lower Cretaceous-aged Wakino Subgroup, in Kyushu.  C. japonicus is found in the fourth formation of the Wakino Subgroup.

See also

 Prehistoric fish
 List of prehistoric bony fish

References

Ichthyodectiformes
Cretaceous bony fish
Early Cretaceous fish of Asia
Late Cretaceous fish of Asia
Fossils of China
Prehistoric ray-finned fish genera
Freshwater fish